Palaquium ferrugineum is a tree in the family Sapotaceae. The specific epithet ferrugineum means "rusty coloured", referring to the indumentum.

Description
Palaquium ferrugineum features twigs that are reddish brown tomentose. The inflorescences bear up to six flowers.

Distribution and habitat
Palaquium ferrugineum is endemic to Borneo, where it is known only from Sarawak. Its habitat is mixed dipterocarp forests.

References

ferrugineum
Endemic flora of Borneo
Trees of Borneo
Flora of Sarawak
Plants described in 1909